Pterynotus alatus is a species of sea snail, a marine gastropod mollusk in the family Muricidae, the murex snails or rock snails.

References

alatus
Gastropods described in 1798